Anthony Columba McFeely (4 February 19097 October 1986) was an Irish prelate of the Roman Catholic Church.

McFeely was born in Ballybofey and educated at St Columb's College, Derry. He studied for the priesthood at St Patrick's College, Maynooth and the Pontifical Irish College, Rome. He was President of St Columb's from 1950 to 1959; and parish priest of Strabane from then until his appointment to the episcopate.

References

1909 births
Alumni of St Patrick's College, Maynooth
People educated at St Columb's College
1986 deaths
20th-century Roman Catholic bishops in Ireland
Roman Catholic bishops of Raphoe
People from County Londonderry
Alumni of The Irish College, Rome